Homoeosoma obatricostella is a species of snout moth in the genus Homoeosoma. It was described by Émile Louis Ragonot in 1887, and is known from Iran.

References

Moths described in 1887
Phycitini